The Lock Up Self Storage Group, an affiliate of SHS Development, LLC, owns and operates 32 Self storage facilities in 8 different states. The Lock Up is headquartered in Northfield, Illinois, and currently manages more than two million square feet of storage.

History
The Lock Up was founded in 1976 by Robert Soudan and Charles Sample, who built their first self-storage facility in Northbrook, Illinois.  Later, Soudan’s son, Bob Soudan, Jr., took over as president of The Lock Up. Soudan Jr. has also served as regional president, director and national president of the Self Storage Association.

Facilities
The Lock Up provides clients with options like carpeted units, security cameras, controlled access, climate control and wine storage. Many of The Lock Up’s sites are constructed to look like hotels and office buildings to blend into their communities.

Locations

Connecticut 
 Branford

Florida
 Naples
 Sarasota
 North Naples
 Olde Sarasota
 St. Petersburg

Hawaii
 Honolulu
 Pearl City
 Waipo-Gentry
 Waipahu

Illinois
 Avondale
 Chicago-Bucktown
 Chicago-Lincoln Park
 Chicago-River North
 Lake Forest
 Lincolnwood
 Lisle
 Northbrook
 Northfield
 Park Ridge
 River Grove
 Schaumburg
 Skokie
 Willowbrook

Massachusetts
 Cape Cod

Minnesota
 Bloomington
 Eden Prairie
 Minneapolis
 Plymouth
 Downtown, Minneapolis

New Jersey
 Livingston
 Westwood

New York
 East Setauket

See also
Self storage

References

Northfield, Illinois